Speranza deceptrix is a species of moth in the family Geometridae first described by Harrison Gray Dyar Jr. in 1913. It is found in Central and North America.

The MONA or Hodges number for Speranza deceptrix is 6312.

References

Further reading

 

Macariini
Articles created by Qbugbot
Moths described in 1913